Nalassus dryadophilus is a species of darkling beetles belonging to the subfamily Tenebrioninae.

They are mainly present in Albania, Bulgaria, Croatia, France, Italy, Greece, and Romania.

References

External links 
 Biolib
 Fauna Europaea

Tenebrioninae
Beetles of Europe
Beetles described in 1854